Gadolinium oxysulfide (Gd2O2S), also called gadolinium sulfoxylate, GOS or Gadox, is an inorganic compound, a mixed oxide-sulfide of gadolinium.

Uses
	The main use of gadolinium oxysulfide is in ceramic scintillators.  Scintillators are used in radiation detectors for medical diagnostics. The scintillator is the primary radiation sensor that emits light when struck by high energy photons.  Gd2O2S based ceramics exhibit final densities of 99.7% to 99.99% of the theoretical density (7.32 g/cm3) and an average grain size ranging from 5 micrometers to 50 micrometers in dependence with the fabrication procedure. Two powder preparation routes have been successful for synthesizing Gd2O2S: Pr, Ce, F powder complexes for the ceramic scintillators.  These preparations routes are called the halide flux method and the sulfite precipitation method.  The scintillation properties of Gd2O2S: Pr, Ce, F complexes demonstrate that this scintillator is promising for imaging applications.  There are two main disadvantages to this scintillator; one being the hexagonal crystal structure, which emits only optical translucency and low external light collection at the photodiode.  The other disadvantage is the high X-ray damage to the sample.

Terbium-activated gadolinium oxysulfide is frequently used as a scintillator for x-ray imaging. It emits wavelengths between 382-622 nm, though the primary emission peak is at 545 nm. It is also used as a green phosphor in projection CRTs, though its drawback is marked lowering of efficiency at higher temperatures. Variants include, for example, using praseodymium instead of terbium (CAS registry number , EINECS number 271-826-9), or using a mixture of dysprosium and terbium for doping (CAS number , EINECS number 271-824-8).

Gadolinium oxysulfide is a promising luminescent host material, because of its high density (7.32 g/cm3) and high effective atomic number of Gd. These characteristics lead to a high interaction probability for X-ray radiation. Several synthesis routes have been developed for processing Gd2O2S phosphors, including: solid state reaction method, reduction method, combustion synthesis method, emulsion liquid membrane method, and gas sulfuration method.   The solid state reaction method and reduction methods are most commonly used because of their high reliability, low cost, and high luminescent properties. (Gd0.99, Pr0.01)2O2S sub-microphosphors synthesized by homogeneous precipitation method are very promising for a new green emitting material to be applied to the high resolution digital X-ray imaging field   Gadolinium oxysulfide powder phosphors are intensively used for conversion of X-rays to visible light in medical X-ray imaging.  Gd2O2S: Pr based solid state X-ray detectors have been successfully reintroduced to X-ray sampling in medical computed tomography (imaging by sections or sectioning, through the use of any kind of penetrating wave).

Crystal Structure
The crystal structure of gadolinium oxysulfide has Trigonal symmetry (space group number 164).  Each gadolinium ion is coordinated by four oxygen atoms and three sulfur atoms in a non-inversion symmetric arrangement.  The Gd2O2S structure is a sulfur layer with double layers of gadolinium and oxygen in between.

Toxicity
An approved respirator should be worn if exposure to dust could occur when working with gadolinium oxysulfide.  Inhalation may result in lung injuries.  Exposure to gadolinium compounds may cause lung and/or liver damage. Gloves are highly recommended when skin contact is likely.  Contact with the skin may cause rash, redness or dermatitis.  Gadolinium oxysulfide should be stored away from mineral acids, strong oxidizers and flammable materials.  When Gadolinium oxysulfide comes in contact with mineral acids, hydrogen sulfide can be produced.

References

Gadolinium compounds
Oxides
Sulfides
Phosphors and scintillators
Mixed anion compounds